This is a list of captains regent (Capitani Reggenti) of San Marino from 1500 to 1700.

Notes

See also
 Diarchy
 List of captains regent of San Marino, 1243–1500
 List of captains regent of San Marino, 1700–1900
 List of captains regent of San Marino, 1900–present
 Politics of San Marino

List 1500-1700
San Marino, Captains-Regent 1500-1700
Captains Regent